Sanjog is a given name. Notable people with the name include:

Sanjog Chhetri (1982–2003), Indian paratrooper 
Sanjog Adhikari (1950 - Present), Nepali Politician